Hévíz is a spa town in Zala County, Hungary, about  from Keszthely.

Description of the lake
The town is located near Lake Hévíz, the world’s second-largest thermal lake, but biologically the biggest active natural lake. Its temperature is affected by the combination of hot and cold spring waters, coming from 38 meters underground. The biological stability of the lake is shown by the temperature of the water, which has not changed for years and even on the coldest winter days doesn’t drop below . That makes bathing possible in the lake year round. In the summer, the water temperature can reach .

History
The lake's healing properties have been well known for centuries by people who lived here, as far back as the end of the Stone Age. The foundation of bath culture was laid by the Romans in the 2nd century. The city and the bath began developing significantly in the 18th century, related to the Festetics family, who started scientific research about using the water for healing.

Attractions to the city
The city provides facilities for visitors seeking to use the medicinal waters of the lake, including entertainment, hotels, parks, and sports.
 Dr. Schulhof Vilmos Promenade
 Pedestrian Zone
 Building of the City-hall
 Church from the Arpadian age
 Heart of Jesus church
 Holy Spirit Catholic Church
 Calvinist church
 Art Cinema
 Local collections - museum
 Cafeterias
 Egregy Wine Cellars
 Museum of Egregy
 Tomb of the Roman soldier
 Roman ruin garden
 Farmers' market of Hévíz
 Calvary in Egregy
 Water lily nauter trail and treetop walkway

See also
Hévíz Spa
Lake Hévíz
Sármellék International Airport, aka Hévíz-Balaton Airport

Gallery

References

External links 

 Official site 
 Hévíz Virtual Tour, Hévíz Video Portal 
 Hévíz 
 Hévíz at funiq.hu 

Populated places in Zala County
Spa towns in Hungary